Granitsa (also transliterated Granica or Granitza) is a village in southwestern Bulgaria, part of Kyustendil Municipality, Kyustendil Province.

Granitsa lies in a hilly valley in the eastern Osogovo mountains. It is bisected by a ravine, the bed of a rivulet which goes almost dry in the summer and autumn. Granitsa includes several neighbourhoods: Yakimova, Dzhoneva, Gorchovska, Efendiyska and Antova. The village was first mentioned in Vladislav the Grammarian's account of 1448: ПРИ ВЄЛБОУЖДИ НА СЕЛѢ НѢКОТОРЄМИ ЖИВОУЩЄ, ГРАНИЦА ЖЄ ОУБО ТОМОУ ПРОЗВАНѤ ИМОУЩОУ. At the time, the sons of the local Bulgarian noble (bolyarin) and later monk Jacob (Yakov) from Krupnik settled in Saint Luke's Monastery above Granitsa. The three brothers Joasaph (Yoasaf), David and Theophanes (Teofan) reconstructed the deserted and plundered Rila Monastery in 1453–1466. In 1469, they initiated the return of Saint John of Rila's remains from Veliko Tarnovo to the monastery. The village's name is derived from the dialectal word granítsa, "a sort of branched oak", from the Bulgarian word granka, "offshoot, offset".

Granitsa was also mentioned in Ottoman tax registers of 1576 as Graniçe. In the 19th century, most of the land in the village was the property of Turkish (Liman Ağa, Daut Beg) and Jewish (Sari Bohor) farm owners from Kyustendil. Landmarks in and around the village include the Bulgarian National Revival-time Church of Saint Elijah (1856–1857) and the residential defensive tower known as the Granitski House (1856), both built by Master Milenko. The Granitsa Monastery of Saint Luke lies to the southwest and may date to the 10th century; reconstructed in 1948, it is a fully active Bulgarian Orthodox monastery. Also southwest of Granitsa are the ruins of the eponymous medieval fortress from the Second Bulgarian Empire, probably a defensive station on the Velbazhd-Štip road. Another landmark is the Venerable Beech Forest, a protected area established in 1995 and covering .

The village's football club is called Slavia and plays in the municipal amateur league. The local industry is represented by a branch of the Kyustendil winery. Wine production, vine and fruit growing are well developed. There is a regular bus link to the municipal and provincial capital.

Gallery

References

 
 

Villages in Kyustendil Province